Grymalow can refer to:
 Grzymałów, a village in Łódź Voivodeship, Poland 
 Grzymałów, a village in Lesser Poland Voivodeship, Poland
 Grzymałów, another name for Hrymailiv, a town in Ternopil Oblast of Ukraine